The Berkmans Speed Scout was an early American biplane scout built by the Berkmans brothers for the United States Army Air Service. It was tested in 1918 with positive results, but the end of World War I meant no production order was received, and no more aircraft were built.

Specifications

References

Bibliography

External links 
 Berkmans Speed Scout

1910s United States military reconnaissance aircraft
Biplanes
Berkmans aircraft
Single-engined tractor aircraft
Aircraft first flown in 1917